State Highway 9 (West Bengal) is a state highway in West Bengal, India.

Route
SH 9 originates from Durgapur and passes through Barjora, Beliatore, Bikna, Bankura, Taldangra, Simlapal, Raipur Bazar, Phulkusma, Silda, Gidhni, Chilkigarh, Gopiballavpur, Chhatinasol and terminates at Nayagram.

The total length of SH 9 is 251 km.

Districts traversed by SH 9 are:
Paschim Bardhaman district (0 – 7 km)Bankura district (7 – 89 km)Jhargram district (89 – 251 km)

Major Locations on State Highway

Paschim Bardhaman:- 

 Durgapur

Bankura :- 

 Barjora
 Beliator
 Bankura
 Simlapal

Jhargram:- 

 Benagaria
 Dharsa
 Fekohaat
 Nayangram

Toll Plazas 
The only toll plaza is in Pratappur on the Bankura bank of Damodar just after the Durgapur Barrage and is named as Durgapur Toll Plaza. The toll plaza is 6 laned and is yet to start post the expansion of the Durgapur part of the Highway to 4 lane highway.

Future Plans 
The section of the highway from Muchipara to Durgapur barrage is being 4 laned as per the decisions taken by the West Bengal Government in 2017. Under this project, several new bridges are being constructed. The rail over bridge was also made operational for about a year now. A whole new 4 Laned wide bridge is planned as a substitute for the shaky Durgapur Barrage which was not repaired even once since its construction in 1950. The barrage has developed cracks and is hazardous now. Owing to these reasons a whole new bridge is under construction and hopefully will be complete in 3 years. The work of four landing is at its peak. The entire road would be wide 4 laned with street light mounted dividers with a railing. The road would also possess a footpath along its entire length. There would be bus stops on sides and traffic signals to control the heavy traffic of the Durgapur flank of this road.

Road sections
It is divided into different sections as follows:.

See also
List of state highways in West Bengal

References

Transport in Durgapur
State Highways in West Bengal